{{DISPLAYTITLE:C2H2O2}}
The molecular formula C2H2O2 may refer to:

 Acetylenediol, or ethynediol: 
 Glyoxal: 
 Acetolactone: